The Battle of Curuzú occurred between September 1 and 3, 1866 during the Paraguayan War. After the first Battle of Tuyutí, won by the Allies on 24 May 1866, an Allied council of war decided to use their navy to bombard and capture the Paraguayan battery at Curupayty.

Battle
On September 1, five Brazilian ironclads, Bahia, Barroso, Lima Barros, Rio de Janeiro and Brasil began bombarding the batteries at Curuzú, which continued the next day. That is when the Rio de Janeiro hit two mines and sank immediately along with her commander Américo Brasílio Silvado, and 50 sailors.

Simultaneously, 8,391 men of the Brazilian 2nd Corps, under the command of Manuel Marques de Sousa, then Viscount of Porto Alegre, attacked the Paraguayan batteries at Curuzú, south of the main stronghold of Humaitá on the shores of Paraguay River.

On September 3, the fort, commanded by colonel Giménez, was stormed. The defenders relied on the advantage of the wetlands and bushes around the fort. The fort was conquered after a heavy bombardment, and the Paraguayan army was pursued until the vicinity of Curupayty.

The Brazilian ironclad Rio de Janeiro had a hole blown in her bottom by a contact mine, and sank almost immediately – the greater part of her crew, together with her captain, being drowned. This was the only ironclad sunk during the war.

Aftermath
President Francisco Solano López decimated the 10th Infantry Battalion on 10 September 1866, killing 63 men.

Gallery

References 

 DONATO, Hernâni. Dicionário das batalhas brasileiras. 2a ed, IBRASA, 1996, 593 pp.

Battles of the Paraguayan War
Battles involving Argentina
Battles involving Brazil
Battles involving Paraguay
Battles involving Uruguay
Conflicts in 1866
September 1866 events
1866 in Paraguay
History of Ñeembucú Department